This is a list of Italian television related events from 1991.

Events

RAI 
4 May - The 36th Eurovision Song Contest is held at the Studio 15 di Cinecittà in Rome. Sweden wins the contest with the song "Fångad av en stormvind", performed by Carola.
8 August - The cargo ship Vlora, charged with almost 20,000 Albanian migrants, lands by force to the “coals quay”of the Bari port; the cameras of TGR Apulia shoot the scene. In the next days, the RAI news (both local and national) follow the development of events, showing to Italy the dramatic image of the refugees amassed in the Stadio della Vittoria, until to the forced repatriation of the most of them.

Fininvest 
13 January: on Canale 5, debut of TG5, the first Finivest news program, directed by Enrico Mentana and hosted, besides the same Mentana, by Cristina Parodi and Cesara Buonamici. The first edition is troubled by several technical problems but is gratified by a greeting message from London of the president Francesco Cossiga. Soon, the Canale 5 journal, focused on current news instead of politic and conducted by Mentana with a pressing rhythm, becomes a serious competitor for the high-flown RAI news programs. 
17 January: on Italia 1, Emilio Fede, director of Studio Aperto (Open Studio), beating on time RAI, announces on air the beginning of Desert Storm and follows the events with a long special edition, until 8 AM; the news program had been launched just the day before. The 29 July, TG4, the third Finivest news program, starts on Rete4, directed by Edvige Bernasconi.
1 October - Long running US animated comedy series The Simpsons begins broadcasting on television stations all across Italy for the first time. The series was premiered on Canale 5.

Debuts

Rai

Miniseries 

 Felipe ha gli occhi azzurri (Felipe has blue eyes) – by Gianfranco Albano and Felice Farina, with Claudio Amendola, Silvio Orlando and the eight-years old Filipino child Victor Vicente as protagonist; 2 seasons. The miniseries, also if treats challenging topics like the clandestine immigration and the exploitation of the minors, gets a huge public success, with 10 million viewiers.

Serials 

 I ragazzi del muretto (The little wall boys) – coming-of-age serial, set in a Rome high-school, with Francesca Antonelli and Lorenzo Diglio; 3 seasons. Unlike many similar products, it treats also serious matters as racism and drug.

Variety 

 Avanzi (Leftovers) – with Serena Dandini (also author), Corrado Guzzanti and a debuting Luciana Litizzetto; 3 seasons. It begins as a parody of the Italian television while in the two later seasons the satire is extended to the whole society. The leftovers of the title are “shows never aired, found in the RAI archives”, obviously staged by the actors.
 Scommettiamo che… (Let's make a bet) – Italian version of the German show Wetten, dass..?, hosted by Fabrizio Frizzi and Milly Carlucci, care of Michele Guardì; 10 seasons.

News and educational 

 Diritto di replica (Right to reply) – semiserious talk show, hosted by Sandro Paternostro and Fabio Fazio, with controversial personalities defending themselves as guests ; 2 seasons.
 Turisti per caso (Accidental tourists) – humorous travel show, with Patrizio Roversi and Syusy Blady; 18 seasons.

Fininvest

Variety 

 Non è la RAI (It's not RAI) – musical and game show ideated by Gianni Boncompagni and hosted by Erica Bonaccorti, Paolo Bonolis and Ambra Angiolini (debuting 15 years old), with a cast composed almost entirely by female teen-agers, some of which, as Angiolini herself and Claudia Gerini, destined to a career in the show business; 4 seasons. The program becomes a cultural phenomenon, with episodes of stardom for the adolescent showgirls but is also heavily criticized for the given image of the young woman, shallow and sexually precocious.
Bellezze sulla neve (Beauties on the snow) – winter version of Bellezze al bagno, aired from ski resorts, hosted by Marco Columbro and Lorella Cuccarini, later by Claudio Lippi and Sabrina Salerno; 2 seasons.

International
9 September -  Tiny Toon Adventures (Canale 5) (1990-1995)
1 October -  The Simpsons (Canale 5) (1989–present)
31 December -  Marianne 1ère (Canale 5) (1990)
 Samurai Pizza Cats (Odeon TV) (1991)
 Chip 'n Dale: Rescue Rangers (Rai 1) (1989-1990)
 The Tom & Jerry Kids Show (Rai 1) (1990-1993)

Television shows

RAI

Serials 

 Il commissario Corso (Chief Corso) – by Alberto Sironi and Gianni Lepre, with Diego Abantantuono as a Southern police superintendent in Milan; realized for the coproduction series Eurocops.

News and educational 

 Il portalettere (The postman) – Piero Chiambretti, as an irreverent postman, delivers  the Andrea Barbato’s open letters to public personalities, moreover politicians; the last one is the Republic President Francesco Cossiga,. 
 Profondo Nord (Deep North) – political talk show hosted by Gad Lerner; the journalist travels among the Northern Italy towns, trying to understand the reasons of the Lega Nord’s success.
Viaggio in Italia, schegge dagli anni ’60 (Journey in Italy, splinters from the Sixties) – montage film by Filippo Porcelli, realized exclusively with material from the RAI archives.

Fininvest

Drama 

 Fantaghirò – fantasy by Lamberto Bava, with Alessandra Martines, Mario Adorf and Kim Rossi Stuart, from an Italo Calvino’s fairy tale; in 2 episodes. The story of the warrior princess is the first Fininvest fiction to get international success and originates a long franchise.

Serial 
Cristina, l’Europa siamo noi (Cristina, we are the Europe) – with Cristina D’Avena, sequel of Arriva Cristina.

Ending this year

Births

Deaths

See also
List of Italian films of 1991

References